La Femme is a women-only beach in Marina, Egypt that mainly caters to Muslims who want to swim in comfort away from men and cameras. It is owned by Mohamed el Saadany, it was decorated by Lamia Yehia, and it's managed by Camilia el Saadany.

External links
Egypt unveils no-peeking zone - Mariam Fam (AP) October 26, 2005

 

Beaches of Egypt
Islam and women
Islam in Egypt
Matrouh Governorate
Women-only spaces
History of women in Egypt